Abanayop is a village on the Gabon-Equatorial Guinea border. It lies along the N5 road (Gabon). On Google Maps the village is shown within the territory of Gabon, but on most database websites it is listed as a settlement within Equatorial Guinea.

References

Populated places in Centro Sur
Populated places in Woleu-Ntem Province
Equatorial Guinea–Gabon border crossings